Formula V Air Racing is an American motorsport that involves small aircraft using engines up to  in displacement.

History 
The proposal for Formula V has its roots in the 1964 Reno Air Races.
In 1969, Air racer, Steve Wittman presented at the Rockford air convention of the Experimental Aircraft Association specifications for a racing event based around aircraft powered with a Volkswagen air-cooled engine.

Racers compete around a 2-mile oval course that subject the racers to up to 2.2g.

Several aircraft were capable of meeting the specifications for Formula V at its creation. Specific designs were introduced shortly after that maximized speed for the configuration.

Aircraft include:

Monnett Sonerai
Wittman V-Witt
Southern Aeronautical Renegade
Southern Aeronautical Scamp

Champions 

Winners of the Formula V National Championship are determined by points from the years events. Since 1995 the winner also holds The Wittman Trophy for a year.

Steve Wittman 1977-81
Charles Terry 1985
Rick Leonard 1987-88
Brian Dempsey 1989-95  Sonerai "Miss Annapolis"
Dave Patterson 1996-97

References

External links
Formula V Air Racing Association

Air racing